Wanderers Stadium is a cricket ground in Illovo, Johannesburg in South Africa. The ground was built in the 1950s to replace Old Wanderers, which had been built over in 1947, as Johannesburg's major cricket ground. The ground opened in 1956 and the first Test match was played on the ground the same year. The ground's first One Day International (ODI) was played in 1992 and its first Twenty20 International played in 2005. The first women's international played on the ground took place in 1960 and it has hosted women's Test, ODI and T20I cricket. The 2003 Cricket World Cup Final was played on the ground and it hosted matches in the 2007 ICC World Twenty20, including the first match of the tournament and the final.

In cricket, a five-wicket haul (also known as a "five-for" or "fifer") refers to a bowler taking five or more wickets in a single innings. This is regarded as a notable achievement. This article details the five-wicket hauls taken on the ground in official international Test matches, One Day Internationals and Twenty20 Internationals.

The first five-wicket haul taken in an international match on the ground was taken by England bowler Trevor Bailey who took five wickets for the cost of 20 runs (5/20) against South Africa in the ground's first Test match in 1956. South Africa's Hugh Tayfield's innings bowling figures of 9/113 in 1957 against England are the best innings bowling figures in a Test match on the ground. Tayfield was the first South African to take nine wickets in an innings. The only five-wicket haul in a women's Test match was taken by South African Lorna Ward in 1972.

The first five-wicket haul in an ODI on the ground was take by South Africa's Shaun Pollock in 2000. Pollock's figures of 5/20 against England remain the best ODI bowling figures in the ground. The first five-wicket hauls in T20I matches on the ground were both taken on 18 February 2018. South Africa's Shabnim Ismail took 5/30 in a women's T20I ahead of India's Bhuvneshwar Kumar repeating the feat in a men's match later on the same day.

Key

Test Match five-wicket hauls

A total of 55 five-wicket hauls have been taken on the ground in Test matches, all but one of them in men's matches.

Men's matches

Women's matches

One Day International five-wicket hauls

Five five-wicket hauls have been taken in ODIs on the ground, four in men's cricket and one in women's cricket.

Men's matches

Women's matches

Twenty20 International five-wicket hauls

Four five-wicket hauls have been taken in T20I matches on the ground, two in men's cricket and two in women's cricket.

Women's matches

Men's matches

Notes

References

External links
International five-wicket hauls at Wanderers, CricInfo

Wanderers
Wanderers